Lovis Corinth (21 July 1858 – 17 July 1925) was a German artist and writer whose mature work as a painter and printmaker realized a synthesis of impressionism and expressionism.

Corinth studied in Paris and Munich, joined the Berlin Secession group, later succeeding Max Liebermann as the group's president. His early work was naturalistic in approach. Corinth was initially antagonistic towards the expressionist movement, but after a stroke in 1911 his style loosened and took on many expressionistic qualities. His use of color became more vibrant, and he created portraits and landscapes of extraordinary vitality and power. Corinth's subject matter also included nudes and biblical scenes.

Early life 
Corinth was born Franz Heinrich Louis on 21 July 1858 in Tapiau, in the Province of Prussia in the Kingdom of Prussia. The son of a tanner, he displayed a talent for drawing as a child. In 1876 he went to study painting in the academy of Königsberg. Initially intending to become a history painter, he was dissuaded from this course by his chief instructor at the academy, the genre painter Otto Günther. In 1880 he traveled to Munich, which rivaled Paris as the avant-garde art center in Europe at the time. There he studied briefly with Franz von Defregger before gaining admission to the Academy of Fine Arts Munich, where he studied under Ludwig von Löfftz. The realism of Corinth's early works was encouraged by Löfftz's teaching, which emphasized careful observation of colors and values. Other important influences were Courbet and the Barbizon school, through their interpretation by the Munich artists Wilhelm Leibl and Wilhelm Trübner .

Except for an interruption for military service in 1882–83, Corinth studied with Löfftz until 1884. He then traveled to Antwerp, where he greatly admired the paintings of Rubens, and then in October 1884 to Paris where he studied under William-Adolphe Bouguereau and Tony Robert-Fleury at the Académie Julian. He concentrated especially on improving his drawing skills, and made the female nude his frequent subject. He was disappointed, however, in his repeated failure to win a medal at the Salon, and returned to Königsberg in 1888 when he adopted the name "Lovis Corinth".

Career

In 1891, Corinth returned to Munich, but in 1892 he abandoned the Munich Academy and joined the Munich Secession. In 1894 he joined the Free Association, and in 1899 he participated in an exhibition organized by the Berlin Secession. These nine years in Munich were not his most productive, and he was perhaps better known for his ability to drink large amounts of red wine and champagne.

Corinth moved to Berlin in 1900, and had a one-man exhibition at a gallery owned by Paul Cassirer. In 1902 at the age of 43, he opened a school of painting for women and married his first student, Charlotte Berend, some 20 years his junior. Charlotte was his youthful muse, his spiritual partner, and the mother of his two children. She had a profound influence on him, and family life became a major theme in his art. Another of his students was Doramaria Purschian.

He published numerous essays on art history, and in 1908 published Das Erlernen der Malerei ("On Learning to Paint").

In December 1911, he suffered a stroke, and was partially paralyzed on his left side. Thereafter he walked with a limp, and his hands displayed a chronic tremor. With the help of his wife, within a year he was painting again with his right hand. His disability inspired in the artist an intense interest in the simple, intimate things of daily life. In the summer of 1919, for example, he produced a cycle of casual etchings of his family in their country home. It was also at this time that landscapes became a significant part of his oeuvre. These landscapes were set at the Walchensee, a lake in the Bavarian Alps where Corinth owned a house. Their lively picturing, in bright colors, tempt many to consider the Walchensee series as his best work.

He painted numerous self-portraits, and made a habit of painting one every year on his birthday as a means of self-examination. In many of his self-portraits he assumed guises such as an armored knight (The Victor, 1910), or Samson (The Blinded Samson, 1912).

Not all of Corinth's works were appreciated in his lifetime: upon learning of his death, Danish critic Georg Brandes wrote in a letter to his secretary that it was Corinth's “punishment for such a wretched portrait of myself”.

From 1915–25, he served as President of the Berlin Secession. In 1920 an anthology of his art-historical writings was published in Berlin. In 1922 his works were exhibited in the Venice Biennale. On 15 March 1921 Corinth received an honorary doctorate from the University of Königsberg. In 1925, he traveled to the Netherlands to view the works of his favorite Dutch masters. He caught pneumonia and died in Zandvoort.

Printmaking
Corinth explored every print technique except aquatint; he favored drypoint and lithography. He created his first etching in 1891 and his first lithograph in 1894. He experimented with the woodcut medium but made only 12 woodcuts, all of them between 1919 and 1924. He was quite prolific, and in the last 15 years of his life he produced more than 900 graphic works, including 60 self-portraits. The landscapes he created between 1919 and 1925 are perhaps the most desirable images of his entire graphic oeuvre.

Legacy

The house where Corinth was born is still in the town of Tapiau, which is now called Gvardeysk, and located in Kaliningrad Oblast, Russia.

In 1910 Corinth had donated the painting Golgatha for the altar of the church of his birthplace, Tapiau. At the end of the Second World War, when the Red Army invaded East Prussia, this painting disappeared without trace. Tapiau was among the few East Prussian places not devastated by the war, which makes it likely that the painting was looted rather than destroyed.

In 1926, a commemorative exhibition of Corinth's paintings and watercolors was presented at the Nationalgalerie in Berlin, and an exhibition of his prints and drawings was held at the Berlin Academy. By 1930 the Nationalgalerie acquired several major paintings by Corinth in addition to those already in its collection.

During the Third Reich, Corinth's work was condemned by the Nazis as degenerate art. In 1937, Nazi authorities removed 295 of his works from public collections, and transported seven of them to Munich where they were displayed in March 1937 in the Degenerate Art Exhibition.

In 2007, the German city of Hanover returned a painting by Corinth to the heirs of Jewish collector Curt Glaser, who sold it in 1933 to fund his escape from the Nazis. The painting from 1914,  (Roman Landscape), was handed to Glaser's heirs, represented by his U.S.-based niece and her daughter.

In June 2021, the Royal Museums of Fine Arts of Belgium in Brussels agreed to return Corinth's 1913 Blumenstilleben (Still Life with Flowers) to the heir of Gustav and Emma Mayer, who were persecuted by the Nazis and forced to flee because of their Jewish heritage.

Galleries
Landscapes and still lifes

Figures and portraits

Wife, family and self portraits

History painting

See also
 List of German painters
 Degenerate art

Notes

References
Corinth, L., Schuster, P.-K., Vitali, C., & Butts, B. (1996). Lovis Corinth. Munich: Prestel. 
Corinth, L., Uhr, Horst, Berkeley, Los Angeles, Oxford: University of California Press, 1990. 
Makela, Maria. "Corinth, Lovis." Grove Art Online. Oxford Art Online. Oxford University Press.
Rung, Gertrud. "Georg Brandes i Samvær og Breve". Copenhagen: Gyldendalske Boghandel Nordisk Forlag, 1930.

External links

Gallery at "Museumsportal Schleswig-Holstein"
Gallery of works by Lovis Corinth
Corinth Gallery at MuseumSyndicate
German masters of the nineteenth century : paintings and drawings from the Federal Republic of Germany, a full text exhibition catalog from The Metropolitan Museum of Art, which contains material on Lovis Corinth (no. 13–16)

1858 births
1925 deaths
People from Gvardeysk
People from the Province of Prussia
19th-century German painters
19th-century German male artists
German male painters
20th-century German painters
20th-century German male artists
German Impressionist painters
German Expressionist painters
Academy of Fine Arts, Munich alumni
Académie Julian alumni
20th-century German printmakers
Deaths from pneumonia in the Netherlands